Popley Ponds is a   Local Nature Reserve in Basingstoke in Hampshire. It is owned and managed by Basingstoke and Deane Borough Council.

This former quarry is now a pond which has a diverse range of amphibians, including great crested newts. There is also an area of woodland.

References

Local Nature Reserves in Hampshire